Philip Marlowe is a fictional detective.

Philip Marlowe may also refer to:

Radio
 The Adventures of Philip Marlowe, a CBS Radio series
 The BBC Presents: Philip Marlowe, a BBC Radio series
 The New Adventures of Philip Marlowe, an NBC Radio series

Film
 Marlowe

Television
 Philip Marlowe, an ABC Television series
 Philip Marlowe, Private Eye, an HBO/London Weekend Television series